WMCN (91.7 FM) is a radio station broadcasting a variety format. Licensed to St. Paul, Minnesota, United States, the station serves the greater St. Paul area. The station is currently owned by Macalester College and run by students.  The station has held the WMCN call sign since July 30, 1979.

History
This station was granted a final extension to its original construction permit by the Federal Communications Commission on June 20, 1979. The new station was assigned the call sign "KJAB" by the FCC but this was changed to the current WMCN on July 30, 1979.  The station received its broadcast license from the FCC on April 1, 1980.

Programming
Located in the Macalester-Groveland neighborhood, roughly between the twin cities of Minneapolis and St. Paul, Minnesota, WMCN is a low power station and has a broadcast radius of roughly 2.5 to 3 miles.  The freeform programming is hosted by student disc jockeys and the station only operates during the school's terms. Students are required to complete training sessions to familiarize themselves with the station's music library, policies, and broadcast equipment before they are permitted on the air.

WMCN provides Macalester and its surrounding community with music from various genres including rock, Americana, world, jazz, hip-hop, electronic, and classical as well as talk radio programming. Community activist Dan Richmond described WMCN as "one of the first places to look for new music and ideas".

The station began an overhaul of its facilities in 2006, adding enhanced webcast capabilities and working towards the complete digitization of its music library.  The digitization of nearly 20,000 songs was, after some complications, completed in late 2007 with the station announcing plans to sell off its vast CD library when the project was complete.

Former on-air staff
While most student presenters at college radio stations do not pursue careers in broadcasting, some use the experience as a springboard to larger venues. Gregory Keltgen, now better known as "DJ Abilities", got his start as a hip hop DJ providing scratches as part of his older brother Derek's show on WMCN.  Brian Bull, currently an award-winning business and economics reporter for WCPN 90.3 ideastream and contributing reporter for National Public Radio, got his first job in radio hosting a weekly classical music program on WMCN during his freshman year.  Joanna Stein, a 2006 Macalester graduate and WMCN veteran, joined the staff of National Public Radio's Morning Edition program.  Minneapolis/St. Paul community radio station KFAI announcer Jennifer Downham, host of Groove Garden since 1994, says she did not "pursue her musical interests until she became a radio DJ" on WMCN.  Described as "the Queen Mother of the Twin Cities hip-shagging, funked-up improv music scene", the WMCN show she hosted was her first ever job as an announcer.

References

External links
WMCN news blog

Radio stations in Minneapolis–Saint Paul
Independent Public Radio
College radio stations in Minnesota
Radio stations established in 1980
1980 establishments in Minnesota
Macalester College